The Kunstmuseum Stuttgart is a contemporary and modern art museum in Stuttgart, Germany, built and opened in 2005.

Description
The cubic museum building with 5000 m2 of display space was designed by Berlin architects Hascher and Jehle.  During the day it looks like a glass cube, and at nights the interior lighted limestone walls become visible.

Collection
The Kunstmuseum Stuttgart museum's collection comes from the previous "Galerie der Stadt Stuttgart".  The city's collection goes back to a gift from the Marchese Silvio della Valle di Casanova in 1924. 

It contains one of the most important collections of the work of Otto Dix and also works from Willi Baumeister, Adolf Hölzel, Dieter Roth, and others.

See also

List of museums in Germany

External links
 Official website 
 Hascher and Jehle: architects' website with construction photos

Art museums and galleries in Baden-Württemberg
Museums in Stuttgart
Contemporary art galleries in Germany
Modern art museums in Germany
Art museums established in 2005
Buildings and structures completed in 2005
2005 establishments in Germany